Emmett J. Flynn (November 9, 1891 in Denver, Colorado – June 4, 1937 in Hollywood, California) was an American director, screenwriter, actor, and producer.

Filmography

As director 
 1917 : Alimony
 1918 : The Racing Strain
 1919 : Eastward Ho!
 1919 : The Bondage of Barbara
 1919 : Virtuous Sinners
 1919 : A Bachelor's Wife
 1919 : Yvonne from Paris
 1919 : The Lincoln Highwayman
 1920 : The Valley of Tomorrow
 1920 : Shod with Fire
 1920 : Leave It to Me
 1920 : The Untamed
 1920 : The Man Who Dared
 1921 : A Connecticut Yankee in King Arthur's Court
 1921 : Shame
 1921 : The Last Trail
 1922 : A Fool There Was
 1922 : Monte Cristo
 1922 : Without Compromise
 1923 : Hell's Hole
 1923 : In the Palace of the King
 1924 : Nellie, the Beautiful Cloak Model
 1924 : The Man Who Came Back
 1924 : Gerald Cranston's Lady
 1925 : The Dancers
 1925 : Wings of Youth
 1925 : East Lynne
 1926 : The Yankee Señor
 1926 : The Palace of Pleasure
 1926 : Yellow Fingers
 1927 : Married Alive
 1928 : Early to Bed
 1929 : The Veiled Woman
 1929 : Hold Your Man
 1929 : The Shannons of Broadway

As writer 
 1915 : Big Jim's Heart
 1919 : The Lincoln Highwayman
 1925 : East Lynne

As actor 
 1914 : The Pursuit of the Phantom : le fils de Van Zandt

As producer 
 1924 : The Man Who Came Back

External links 

 

Film directors from Colorado
American male screenwriters
American film producers
1890s births
1937 deaths
Male actors from Denver
Screenwriters from Colorado
20th-century American male writers
20th-century American screenwriters